David Fizulievich Samedov (born 24 May 1998) is a Russian football defender who most recently played for Lida in the Belarusian First League.

Career
Samedov made his Belarusian First League debut for Orsha in a 0–0 home draw against Baranovichi on 18 May 2019.

On 17 February 2020, Samedov signed contract with Lida.

References

External links
 

1998 births
Living people
Association football defenders
Russian footballers
Russian expatriate footballers
Expatriate footballers in Belarus
Expatriate footballers in Serbia
Serbian First League players
FK Bežanija players
FC Orsha players
FC Lida players
People from Belorechensk, Krasnodar Krai
Sportspeople from Krasnodar Krai